Edessa rufomarginata, also known as red-bordered stink bug, is a species of stink bug. The species was originally described by Charles De Geer in 1773.

Range 
Edessa rufomarginata is widely distributed in Central America and South America, ranging from Mexico to Argentina.

Ecology 
Edessa rufomarginata is considered a secondary pest of several crops. The species can form a thread to various plants in the family Solanaceae.

References

Taxa named by Charles De Geer
Pentatomidae